The Kumari Temple is a local Hindu temple located in Samakhusi, Nepal.  This is a local temple where people can gather and organize small events, function, Vivaah and many other activities.

The temple has a 3-story building to store the things as well as conduct the Yoga. This is also place for old people service center where people can sing Bhajan and Dance. This is extremely helpful for the old people to pass the time.

Local people of Samakhusi, where they can not go far for their Prayers they come here to Pray. From this temple name the area also named as kumari tole.

History
This is not very old temple by structure but there was a statue of Devi. Locals believe that this is from the 17th Century. Now they have made a small temple and building to protect it.

Gallery

Hindu temples in Kathmandu District
17th-century establishments in Nepal